In mathematics, the ADE classification (originally A-D-E classifications) is a situation where certain kinds of objects are in correspondence with simply laced Dynkin diagrams. The complete list of simply laced Dynkin diagrams comprises

These are two of the four families of Dynkin diagrams (omitting  and ), and three of the five exceptional Dynkin diagrams (omitting  and ).

This list is non-redundant if one takes  for  If one extends the families to include redundant terms, one obtains the exceptional isomorphisms

and corresponding isomorphisms of classified objects.

The A, D, E nomenclature also yields the simply laced finite Coxeter groups, by the same diagrams: in this case the Dynkin diagrams exactly coincide with the Coxeter diagrams, as there are no multiple edges.

Lie algebras 
In terms of complex semisimple Lie algebras:
  corresponds to  the special linear Lie algebra of traceless operators, 
  corresponds to  the even special orthogonal Lie algebra of even-dimensional skew-symmetric operators, and
  are three of the five exceptional Lie algebras.

In terms of compact Lie algebras and corresponding simply laced Lie groups:
  corresponds to  the algebra of the special unitary group 
  corresponds to  the algebra of the even projective special orthogonal group , while
  are three of five exceptional compact Lie algebras.

Binary polyhedral groups 
This connection is known as the  after John McKay. The correspondence uses the construction of McKay graph.

Note that the ADE correspondence is not the correspondence of Platonic solids to their reflection group of symmetries: for instance, in the ADE correspondence the tetrahedron, cube/octahedron, and dodecahedron/icosahedron correspond to  while the reflection groups of the tetrahedron, cube/octahedron, and dodecahedron/icosahedron are instead representations of the Coxeter groups  and 

The orbifold of  constructed using each discrete subgroup leads to an ADE-type singularity at the origin, termed a du Val singularity.

The McKay correspondence can be extended to multiply laced Dynkin diagrams, by using a pair of binary polyhedral groups. This is known as the Slodowy correspondence, named after Peter Slodowy – see .

Labeled graphs 
The ADE graphs and the extended (affine) ADE graphs can also be characterized in terms of labellings with certain properties, which can be stated in terms of the discrete Laplace operators or Cartan matrices.

The affine ADE graphs are the only graphs that admit a positive labeling (labeling of the nodes by positive real numbers) with the following property:
Twice any label is the sum of the labels on adjacent vertices.
That is, they are the only positive functions with eigenvalue 1 for the discrete Laplacian (sum of adjacent vertices minus value of vertex) – the positive solutions to the homogeneous equation:

Equivalently, the positive functions in the kernel of  The resulting numbering is unique up to scale, and if normalized such that the smallest number is 1, consists of small integers – 1 through 6, depending on the graph.

The ordinary ADE graphs are the only graphs that admit a positive labeling with the following property:
Twice any label minus two is the sum of the labels on adjacent vertices.
In terms of the Laplacian, the positive solutions to the inhomogeneous equation:

Other classifications 
The elementary catastrophes are also classified by the ADE classification.

The ADE diagrams are exactly the quivers of finite type, via Gabriel's theorem.

There is also a link with generalized quadrangles, as the three non-degenerate GQs with three points on each line correspond to the three exceptional root systems E6, E7 and E8.
The classes A and D correspond degenerate cases where the line set is empty or we have all lines passing through a fixed point, respectively.

There are deep connections between these objects, hinted at by the classification; some of these connections can be understood via string theory and quantum mechanics.

It was suggested that symmetries of small droplet clusters may be subject to an ADE classification.

The minimal models of two-dimensional conformal field theory have an ADE classification.

Four dimensional  superconformal gauge quiver theories with unitary gauge groups have an ADE classification.

Trinities 
Arnold has subsequently proposed many further connections in this vein, under the rubric of "mathematical trinities", and McKay has extended his correspondence along parallel and sometimes overlapping lines. Arnold terms these "trinities" to evoke religion, and suggest that (currently) these parallels rely more on faith than on rigorous proof, though some parallels are elaborated. Further trinities have been suggested by other authors. Arnold's trinities begin with R/C/H (the real numbers, complex numbers, and quaternions), which he remarks "everyone knows", and proceeds to imagine the other trinities as "complexifications" and "quaternionifications" of classical (real) mathematics, by analogy with finding symplectic analogs of classic Riemannian geometry, which he had previously proposed in the 1970s. In addition to examples from differential topology (such as characteristic classes), Arnold considers the three Platonic symmetries (tetrahedral, octahedral, icosahedral) as corresponding to the reals, complexes, and quaternions, which then connects with McKay's more algebraic correspondences, below.

McKay's correspondences are easier to describe. Firstly, the extended Dynkin diagrams  (corresponding to tetrahedral, octahedral, and icosahedral symmetry) have symmetry groups  respectively, and the associated foldings are the diagrams  (note that in less careful writing, the extended (tilde) qualifier is often omitted). More significantly, McKay suggests a correspondence between the nodes of the  diagram and certain conjugacy classes of the monster group, which is known as McKay's E8 observation; see also monstrous moonshine.

Turning from large simple groups to small ones, the corresponding Platonic groups  have connections with the projective special linear groups PSL(2,5), PSL(2,7), and PSL(2,11) (orders 60, 168, and 660), which is deemed a "McKay correspondence". These groups are the only (simple) values for p such that PSL(2,p) acts non-trivially on p points, a fact dating back to Évariste Galois in the 1830s. Of these, the icosahedron dates to antiquity, the Klein quartic to Klein in the 1870s, and the buckyball surface to Pablo Martin and David Singerman in 2008.

Algebro-geometrically, McKay also associates E6, E7, E8 respectively with: the 27 lines on a cubic surface, the 28 bitangents of a plane quartic curve, and the 120 tritangent planes of a canonic sextic curve of genus 4. The first of these is well-known, while the second is connected as follows: projecting the cubic from any point not on a line yields a double cover of the plane, branched along a quartic curve, with the 27 lines mapping to 27 of the 28 bitangents, and the 28th line is the image of the exceptional curve of the blowup. Note that the fundamental representations of E6, E7, E8 have dimensions 27, 56 (28·2), and 248 (120+128), while the number of roots is 27+45 = 72, 56+70 = 126, and 112+128 = 240.
This should also fit into the scheme  of relating E8,7,6 with the largest three of the sporadic simple groups, Monster, Baby and Fischer 24', cf. monstrous moonshine.

See also 

 Elliptic surface

References

Sources

 
  Problem VIII. The A-D-E classifications (V. Arnold).

External links 
 John Baez, This Week's Finds in Mathematical Physics: Week 62, Week 63, Week 64, Week 65, August 28, 1995, through October 3, 1995, and Week 230, May 4, 2006 
 The McKay Correspondence, Tony Smith
 ADE classification, McKay correspondence, and string theory, Luboš Motl, The Reference Frame, May 7, 2006

Lie groups